Adrián Gavira Collado (born 17 September 1987 in La Línea de la Concepción) is a Spanish beach volleyball player. He currently plays with Pablo Herrera. The pair participated in the 2012 Summer Olympics tournament and lost in the round of 16 to Brazilians Ricardo Santos and Pedro Cunha.

In 2016, the Gavira and Herrera partnership won one gold and one bronze on the FIVB Beach Volleyball World Tour.  At the 2016 Olympics, they qualified from the pool stages, but were drawn against the Brazilian team of Alison Cerutti and Bruno Schmidt in the round of 16.  The Brazilians were the number one seeds and World Champions going into the match, and beat the Spanish pair despite a tight first set.

Notes

References

External links
 
 
 
 
 

1987 births
Living people
Spanish beach volleyball players
Men's beach volleyball players
Beach volleyball players at the 2012 Summer Olympics
Beach volleyball players at the 2016 Summer Olympics
Olympic beach volleyball players of Spain
Beach volleyball players at the 2020 Summer Olympics